Susanne Graversen (born 8 November 1984) is a Danish football goalkeeper. She currently plays for IK Skovbakken.

References
Danish Football Union (DBU) statistics

1984 births
Living people
Danish women's footballers
Denmark women's international footballers
Women's association football goalkeepers
2007 FIFA Women's World Cup players